In classical antiquity, an  or  (from   + , "self-boiling", "self-cooking") was a vessel used for water heating. Basically, it was a vase with a central tube used to keep coals.

Dictionary of Greek and Roman Antiquities describes it as follows:
AUTHEPSA (αὐθέψης), or “self-boiler,” was a vessel used for heating water or keeping it hot. As is well known, both hot and cold water were served by the attendants at well-appointed Roman tables (calidae gelidaeque minister, Juv. 5.63, with Mayor's note). For this purpose vessels were used which cannot have differed much in construction from our modern tea-urns (Böttiger, Sabina, 2.30), and like them might be made of costly materials and in artistic designs (authepsa illa, quam tanto pretio nuper mercatus est, Cic. pro Rose. Amer. 46.133; authepsas argenteas, Lamprid. Heliog. 19).

Many ingenious contrivances for economical and portable cooking have been found at Pompeii and Herculaneum, and are now in the Museo Nazionale (formerly Borbonico) at Naples. Borbon. vol. iii. pl. 63) in the first cut above. This vessel is in bronze, and of very tasteful workmanship: the cylinder in the centre was filled with charcoal, and has a grating which allowed the air to enter and the ashes to escape. The second cut, from Mus. Borbon. vol. v. pl. 44, shows another of more elaborate construction.

References

Heaters
Boilers
Classical antiquity